Francis Bloodgood Hall (November 16, 1827 - October 4, 1903) was a Union Army soldier in the American Civil War who received the U.S. military's highest decoration, the Medal of Honor.

Hall was born in New York on November 16, 1827, and entered service at Plattsburgh, New York in October 1862. He was awarded the Medal of Honor, for extraordinary heroism shown on May 3, 1863, at the Battle of Salem Church, while serving as a Chaplain with the 16th New York Volunteer Infantry Regiment. He mustered out with his regiment a few weeks later. His Medal of Honor was issued on February 16, 1897.

Hall died at the age of 75, on October 4, 1903, and was buried at Riverside Cemetery in Plattsburgh, New York.

Medal of Honor citation

Notes

References

External links
 
 16th Infantry Regiment – Civil War – First St. Lawrence County Regiment; First Northern New York Regiment

1827 births
1903 deaths
People from New York (state)
Burials in New York (state)
People of New York (state) in the American Civil War
Union Army soldiers
United States Army Medal of Honor recipients
American Civil War recipients of the Medal of Honor